Univerzitetsko sportsko društvo Bosna,, commonly abbreviated as USD Bosna, is a multi-sport club based in Sarajevo, Bosnia and Herzegovina.

History

It was founded on December 7, 1947 to organize the existing student sports clubs in Sarajevo. USD Bosna is the largest sport society in SR Bosnia with teams in 19 different sports. The most successful teams are basketball club KK Bosna who won Euroleague Basketball in 1979 and the chess club ŠK Bosna that became the European champion four times.

Clubs

There are 19 competitive clubs that are part of USD Bosna.

Defunct Clubs

Biciklistički klub Bosna
Mačevalački klub Bosna
Ski klub Bosna

References

External links

Multi-sport clubs in Bosnia and Herzegovina
1947 establishments in Bosnia and Herzegovina
Sport in Sarajevo
University and college sports clubs